The  North River is both a stream and a small settlement on that stream, in Northland Region. The stream flows through limestone caves before entering the Pohuenui River, which in turn flows into the Waipu River before this emerges into Bream Bay near Waipu.

Rivers of the Northland Region
Rivers of New Zealand